Marin County Search and Rescue is an all-volunteer organization in Marin County within Marin County Sheriff's Office.  With approximately sixty active members, Marin County's Search and Rescue (Marin SAR) responds to searches for missing children and adults, evidence and other search requests in the county and on mutual aid calls anywhere in the state of California.  Marin SAR is a  mountain rescue Type I team with the motto of: "Anytime, Anywhere, Any Weather."

History
Marin County Search and Rescue (Marin SAR) began as Explorer Post 74 in 1970, focusing on ecology and outdoor education. In 1971, the organization became the first scouting group in Marin to accept young women into the program. In the mid-1970s, several members attended a scouting conference in Washington state and learned about Explorer Search and Rescue.  Marin Explorers returned and convinced the rest of the group to change the focus to search and rescue.

In 2004, Marin County's SAR team became Mountain Rescue Association (MRA) Type I certified—capable of handling the most challenging terrain at the highest elevations. In 2006, Marin SAR hosted the International Mountain Rescue Conference (IMRC), bringing search and rescue experts from all over to train together and share best practices in technical rescue.  In 2010, Marin SAR was one of the coordinating host agencies for SAREX 2010 with responsibility for the coordination and management of the technical rope rescue track.

Today the team, headquartered in  San Rafael,  CA at 10S 054113 420581 UTM, trains and is equipped to respond to sustained wilderness and high altitude searches, missing children searches, mass casualty incidents or natural disasters as well as Urban Search and Rescue (US&R) with some members also members of regional US&R task force and swiftwater rescue.  One of the few Search & Rescue teams to recruit and deploy youth members, on average Marin's SAR team has approximately 30 high-school age members and in a typical year deploys on 50+ missions throughout the State of California including Yosemite.

Operations 
Due to the diverse geography of Marin County, its proximity to major population centers, and natural tourist attractions, Marin County's SAR team operates closely with  National Park Service (NPS) rangers, California State Park Rangers, Marin Watershed management, Marin County Open Space District as well as local law enforcement, fire, and civic organizations.

Resources 
Marin SAR fields six Search & Rescue vehicles including one SUV, a 4x4 van, a command vehicle and three emergency service vehicles.  Additionally the team has two ATVs, a UTV and an IRB.

See also
California Region of the Mountain Rescue Association
Mountain Rescue
Mountain Rescue Association
Search and Rescue
Wilderness First Aid
Wilderness First Responder (WFR)
Wilderness Emergency Medical Technician (WEMT)

References

External links
Marin County's Search & Rescue website
Bay Area Search & Rescue Council
California Region of the Mountain Rescue Association
Marin IJ News article
NBC Bay Area News on a recent search
Successful search in Mendocino National Forest
Mountain Rescue Association
Marin SAR's training videos
KTVU News story on the interagency rescue on Mt. Tam
KGO-TV Marin SAR assisting in rescue and carry-out in Yosemite National Park
Marin IJ Marin SAR assisting in rescue and carry-out of a 19-year-old Bay Area man
Marin IJ Marin search unit played key role in Mendocino rescue
CNN Lost in the wilderness: 72-year-old man survives 19 days, eating lizards, squirrels

Rescue
Rescue agencies
Organizations based in Marin County, California
Non-profit organizations based in the San Francisco Bay Area
Mountain rescue agencies